Ayesha Ayaz (born c. 2011) is a Pakistani taekwondo practitioner. She is the country's youngest female practitioner having started practicing this martial art at the age of 3 and made her international debut at 8. She is also the youngest national champion.

Background 
Ayaz was born to Ayaz and Bushra Naik  in Swat Valley, Khyber Pakhtunkhwa. Her father is the coach of Pakistan's national team while her mother is a double national champion. Her father also runs a martial arts training academy in Swat. She has two brothers, both of whom are also taekwondo practitioners.

Career and accomplishments 
Ayaz is the youngest competitor to win a bronze medal for Pakistan in 27 kg category at the Al-Fujairah Open Taekwondo Championship in Dubai in 2019.

In Feb 2020, the talented young athlete earned a gold medal in 34 kg category at the 8th Al-Fujairah Open Taekwondo Championship in Dubai.

Besides her global achievements, Ayaz has secured the title of district champion five times. She has remained provincial champion twice. Moreover, she takes pride in being a national taekwondo champion thrice.

References 

Sportspeople from Khyber Pakhtunkhwa
Pakistani taekwondo practitioners
Pakistani female taekwondo practitioners
Living people
Year of birth missing (living people)
People from Swat District